Hauser is a city in Kootenai County, Idaho, United States. The population was 678 at the 2010 census. The city is located on the southern end of Hauser Lake.

Geography
Hauser is located at  (47.770399, -117.017401). The Washington-Idaho state line lies just to the west of Hauser. Idaho State Highway 53 runs along the southern edge of the city, providing transportation east to Rathdrum and west into Spokane metropolitan area. Hauser is part of the larger Spokane–Coeur d'Alene combined statistical area.

Demographics

2010 census
As of the census of 2010, there were 678 people, 302 households, and 190 families living in the city. The racial makeup of the city was 94.5% White, 0.3% African American, 1.0% Native American, 0.4% Asian, 0.1% Pacific Islander, 0.3% from other races, and 3.2% from two or more races. Hispanic or Latino of any race were 2.1% of the population.

There were 302 households, of which 26.5% had children under the age of 18 living with them, 48.7% were married couples living together, 9.9% had a female householder with no husband present, 4.3% had a male householder with no wife present, and 37.1% were non-families. 28.1% of all households were made up of individuals, and 6.6% had someone living alone who was 65 years of age or older. The average household size was 2.25 and the average family size was 2.72.

The median age in the city was 44.2 years. 19.8% of residents were under the age of 18; 6.5% were between the ages of 18 and 24; 25.4% were from 25 to 44; 35.8% were from 45 to 64; and 12.5% were 65 years of age or older. The gender makeup of the city was 49.1% male and 50.9% female.

2000 census
As of the census of 2000, there were 668 people, 273 households, and 197 families living in the city. The racial makeup of the city was 95.36% White, 1.20% Native American, 0.30% Asian, and 3.14% from two or more races. Hispanic or Latino of any race were 2.25% of the population.

There were 273 households, out of which 32.6% had children under the age of 18 living with them, 57.9% were married couples living together, 9.5% had a female householder with no husband present, and 27.8% were non-families. 20.5% of all households were made up of individuals, and 5.1% had someone living alone who was 65 years of age or older.  The average household size was 2.45 and the average family size was 2.83.

In the city, the population was spread out, with 24.3% under the age of 18, 8.1% from 18 to 24, 31.6% from 25 to 44, 27.2% from 45 to 64, and 8.8% who were 65 years of age or older.  The median age was 36 years. For every 100 females, there were 95.3 males.  For every 100 females age 18 and over, there were 94.6 males.

The median income for a household in the city was $30,268, and the median income for a family was $32,344. Males had a median income of $30,000 versus $21,125 for females. The per capita income for the city was $15,085.  About 10.3% of families and 10.6% of the population were below the poverty line, including 13.0% of those under age 18 and 12.5% of those age 65 or over.

See Also 

 Hauser Refueling Facility

References

Cities in Idaho
Cities in Kootenai County, Idaho